Jan Nicolaas van Munster (born 3 July 1939 in Gorinchem) is a Dutch sculptor and installation artist whose work appears in many public places in the Netherlands and Germany.

Biography 
Van Munster studied from 1955-1957 at the Academy of Fine Arts and Applied Sciences in Rotterdam, and from 1957-1960 at the Instituut voor Kunstnijverheidsonderwijs in Amsterdam.

After graduation van Munster settled as independent artist in Gorinchem. In 1967 he moved to Rotterdam, where he worked until 1985. From 1987 to 1991 he worked is Noordwelle, Schouwen-Duiveland, from 1989 to 2003 in Renesse, Schouwen-Duiveland, and afterwards in Vlissingen.

In 1966 he received the A. Schwartz Prize, in 1971 the Hendrik Chabot Prize, and in 2002 the Wilhelmina-ring. From 1968-1970 he was a lecturer at the Ateliers '63 in Haarlem, from 1974-1977 at the Rotterdam Art Academy and from 1978-1990 at the Academy of Art and Design St. Joost 's-Hertogenbosch.

Van Munster is initiator and founder of the IK foundation (Stichting IK; based on his "IK" works, see below). Since 2011, this foundation has managed an artist residency and exhibition space located in a former water tower and adjacent buildings in the Dutch village Oost-Souburg.

Work 
Van Munster’s work is minimalist. He has worked in wood, stone, bronze, glass and other materials, and has also produced light sculptures and video art.  The focus of his work has been on all forms of energy as a metaphor for life, with an emphasis on light and the energy with which it is loaded.

Tensions and oppositions, for example, between light and dark or heat and cold, are often illustrated in his work.

Notable projects include the Plus-Minus initiative, and the “IK” works. His works can be found in many cities in the Netherlands and Germany, in public spaces and museum and private collections. One of his works is part of the collection of the Centre for International Light Art (CILA) in Unna, Germany.

In popular culture
Van Munster's 1981 work Energie-Piek ijs was pictured on the inside cover of the 1988 Joy Division compilation CD Substance, while his light sculpture Plus et Min featured on the inner sleeve art of the reissued single Atmosphere released from the same album.  The latter in turn inspired the title and artwork of the band's compilation box set +- Singles 1978-80.

External links to the artwork: Energie-Piek ijs and Plus et Min, the alphabet used is designed by Wim Crouwel a graphic designer who is also Dutch.

Exhibitions
1987: Wilhelm-Hack-Museum, Ludwigshafen
2001: Museum van Hedendaagse Kunst, Antwerpen
2004: Die Energie des Bildhauers, Wilhelm-Hack-Museum, Ludwigshafen
2005: Zentrum für Kunst und Medientechnologie (ZKM), Karlsruhe

Sculptures Gallery

Sculptures in the Netherlands

Sculptures in Germany

References

Further reading
 Paul Hefting, Jan van Munster "Energie in beeld", Veen/Reflex (1988)
 Peter Lodermeyer, Jan van Munster Licht | Light, Jap Sam Books (2012) 
 Lisette Pelser, Jan van Munster, Die Energie des Bildhauers, Werkverzeichnis 1960–2000. Mainz 2001

External links 

 Official Jan van Munster website
 RTV N-H TV documentary and interview with Jan van Munster
 Jan Van Munster at the Netherlands Media Art Institute

Dutch contemporary artists
Abstract sculptors
Dutch installation artists
1939 births
Living people
Dutch male sculptors
People from Gorinchem
20th-century Dutch sculptors
21st-century Dutch sculptors
20th-century Dutch male artists